The International Society for Bayesian Analysis (ISBA) is a society with the goal of promoting Bayesian analysis for solving problems in the sciences and government. It was formally incorporated as a not for profit corporation by economist Arnold Zellner and statisticians Gordon M. Kaufman and Thomas H. Leonard on 10 November 1992. It publishes the electronic journal Bayesian Analysis and organizes world meetings every other year.

ISBA is an "official partner" of the Joint Statistical Meetings.

List of presidents
The president of ISBA is elected annually. Service typically lasts three years, since the offices of President Elect and Past President are also official positions.

 1992–1996 Arnold Zellner (founding co-president)
 1992–1996 Jose Bernardo (founding co-president)
 1996–1997 Stephen Fienberg
 1998 Susie Bayarri
 1999 John Geweke
 2000 Philip Dawid
 2001 Alicia Carriquiry
 2002 David Draper
 2003 Edward George
 2004 Jim Berger
 2005 Sylvia Richardson
 2006 Alan Gelfand
 2007 Peter Green
 2008 Christian Robert
 2009 Mike West
 2010 Peter Müller
 2011 Michael I. Jordan
 2012 Fabrizio Ruggeri
 2013 Merlise Clyde
 2014 Sonia Petrone
 2015 Alexandra Schmidt
 2016 Steven MacEachern
 2017 Kerrie Mengersen
 2018 Marina Vannucci
 2019 Raquel Prado
 2020 Sylvia Frühwirth-Schnatter
 2021 Igor Pruenster
 2022 Sudipto Banerjee

References

External links
 The Official Website of the ISBA

Bayesian statistics
Economics societies
Statistical societies
International scientific organizations
Organizations established in 1992